The Postal Service Reform Act of 2022 is a federal statute intended to address "the finances and operations of the U.S. Postal Service (USPS)", specifically to lift budget requirements imposed on the Service by the Postal Accountability and Enhancement Act and require it to continue six day a week delivery of mail.

The act was first introduced on May 11, 2021, by Representative Carolyn Maloney (D-NY). The House of Representatives then passed the bill by 342–92 on February 8, 2022. On March 8, 2022, the Senate voted 79–19 to pass the bill. President Biden signed the bill into law on April 6, 2022.

Background 
Similar bills to the Postal Service Reform Act have been proposed in recent years, but none passed. The Postal Accountability and Enhancement Act (PAEA), passed in 2006, required the USPS to pre-fund benefits for future retirees, and this cost the agency about $5.5 billion annually. The PAEA required the USPS to pre-fund these pensions more than fifty years in advance. This requirement caused the USPS to accumulate billions in debt annually in recent years. The USPS Fairness Act would have allowed the USPS to still continue to pay benefits from the accumulated funding (about $56.8 billion in 2020) until depleted, but the intended purpose of the USPS Fairness Act was to remove the pre-funding requirements placed on the agency by the PAEA. That bill passed in the House (309—106) in 2019 but died in the Senate. The Postal Service Reform Act of 2022 eliminated the requirement to pre-fund retiree benefits. Retiring postal employees will now be required to enroll in Medicare.

Criticism 

Paul Steidler of the Lexington Institute criticized the law for failing to:
 Reverse the slowdown of mail delivery times
 Allow the pre-paid pension and medical benefit funds to be partially invested in higher-return stocks rather than the current mandate of 100% U.S. treasury bonds
 Require the USPS to allocate resources more efficiently by adopting the "greenfield modern bottom-up costing and revenue measurement system" recommended by the USPS Inspector General in 2014.

References 

United States Postal Service
Acts of the 117th United States Congress
United States federal postal legislation